James Mulvaney (13 May 1941 – 15 August 1982) was an English professional footballer who played in the Football League for Barrow, Hartlepools United and Stockport County.

References

1941 births
1982 deaths
English footballers
Association football forwards
English Football League players
Whitby Town F.C. players
Hartlepool United F.C. players
Barrow A.F.C. players
Stockport County F.C. players